Seili may refer to:

Själö, an island known as Seili in Finnish
Seili, a 2010 album by Jenni Vartiainen
"Seili", a song of the album